Sincere McCormick (born September 10, 2000) is an American football running back for the Las Vegas Raiders of the National Football League (NFL). He played college football at UTSA.

College career
As a freshman in 2019, McCormick rushed for 983 yards and eight touchdowns on 177 carries, an average of 5.6 yards per carry. He was selected as the Conference USA Freshman of the Year.

As a sophomore in 2020, he rushed for 1,467 yards, second most among all Division I FBS players. He was selected as the Conference USA Offensive Player of the Year, a semifinalist for the Doak Walker Award, and a second-team All-American.

As a junior in 2021, he rushed for 1,479 yards, fifth best among all Division I FBS players. After carrying 42 times for 184 yards and three touchdowns against Memphis, he was named National Player of the Week. He also helped lead the 2021 UTSA Roadrunners football team to a 12–1 record. In the 2021 Conference USA Football Championship Game, McCormick was named the Most Valuable Player, after rushing for 204 yards and three touchdowns on 36 carries.

Professional career

Las Vegas Raiders
McCormick signed with the Las Vegas Raiders on May 4, 2022. He was placed on injured reserve on May 24, 2022.

References

External links
 Las Vegas Raiders bio
 UTSA Roadrunners bio

2000 births
Living people
Players of American football from Long Beach, California
American football running backs
UTSA Roadrunners football players
Las Vegas Raiders players
Judson High School alumni